The Activator Method Chiropractic Technique is a chiropractic treatment method and device created by Arlan Fuhr as an alternative to manual manipulation of the spine or extremity joints.  The device is categorized as a mechanical force manual assisted (MFMA) instrument which is generally regarded as a softer chiropractic treatment technique.

Activator Adjusting Instrument 

The traditional Activator Adjusting Instrument (AAI), or more simply, Activator, is a small handheld spring-loaded instrument which delivers a controlled and reproducible impulse to the spine. With the release of the Activator V this process has changed from a spring-loaded grip to an electronic tool which delivers the mechanical force. It was found to give off no more than 0.3 J of kinetic energy in a 3-millisecond pulse. The aim is to produce enough force to move the vertebrae, but not enough to cause injury. The design of the tool was based on a dental impactor.

Activator I was the first product patented by Activator Methods International on September 26, 1978.

In 1994 the Activator II was first released when research at the University of Vermont found that when the initial instrument was given an impedance head it produced a "significant improvement in the frequency content" of the force delivered to the spine. This led to a better activation of mechanoreceptors when adjusting a specific segment of the spine.

Activator V is the newest iteration of Activator products and is a cordless instrument capable of delivering its own adjustment. It is the first FDA registered and approved cordless electronic chiropractic adjustment instrument.

Leg length test reliability 
Although prone "functional leg length" is a widely used chiropractic tool, it is not a recognized anthropometric technique, since legs are often naturally of unequal length, and measurements in the prone position are not entirely valid estimates of standing X-ray differences. Measurements in the standing position are far more reliable. Another confounding factor is that simply moving the two legs held together and leaning them imperceptibly to one side or the other produces different results. The Activator Methods technique uses leg length checks while prone (Position 1) and with the knees bent to 90 degrees (Position 2). Research shows good intraexaminer reliability and moderate interexaminer reliability with leg length checks in position 1, however no consensus has been met on the accuracy of leg length checks in position 1.

Utilization rates 
In 2003, the National Board of Chiropractic Examiners found that 69.9% of chiropractors used the technique, and 23.9% of patients received it.  The majority of US chiropractic schools and some schools in other countries teach the AMCT method, and an estimated 45,000 chiropractors worldwide use AMCT or some part of the technique.

Results 
There have been a number of studies of AMCT, including case reports, clinical studies and randomized controlled trials. A few studies suggest that the activator may be as effective as manual adjustment in treatment of back pain.

See also 
 Chiropractic treatment techniques
 Unequal leg length

References 

Chiropractic treatment techniques